Niphatidae is a  family of demosponges in the order Haplosclerida, first described in 1980 by Rob van Soest. It contains the following genera:
 Amphimedon Duchassaing & Michelotti, 1864
 Cribrochalina Schmidt, 1870
 Dasychalina Ridley & Dendy, 1886
 Gelliodes Ridley, 1884
 Haliclonissa Burton, 1932
 Hemigellius Burton, 1932
 Microxina Topsent, 1916
 Niphates Duchassaing & Michelotti, 1864
 Pachychalina Schmidt, 1868

References 

Haplosclerina
Sponge families
Taxa named by Rob van Soest
Animals described in 1980